Fluocinonide (sold under various brand names) is a potent glucocorticoid used topically as an anti-inflammatory agent for the treatment of skin disorders such as eczema and seborrhoeic dermatitis. It relieves itching, redness, dryness, crusting, scaling, inflammation, and discomfort.

A common potential adverse effect is skin atrophy (thinning of the skin). Systemic absorption of topical corticosteroids can produce reversible hypothalamic-pituitary-adrenal axis (HPA) suppression, manifestations of Cushing's syndrome, hyperglycemia, and glucosuria.

In 2020, it was the 280th most commonly prescribed medication in the United States, with more than 1million prescriptions.

Veterinary uses 
Fluocinonide is used in veterinary medicine. It is a treatment for allergies in dogs. Natural systemic cortisol concentrations can be suppressed for weeks after one week of topical exposure.

References

External links 
 

Acetate esters
Acetonides
Cyclohexanols
Corticosteroid cyclic ketals
Corticosteroid esters
Fluoroarenes
Glucocorticoids
Pregnanes
Diketones
Enones
Fluorinated corticosteroids